Acraea miranda, the Somali acraea or desert acraea, is a butterfly in the family Nymphalidae. It is found in Somalia, south-eastern Ethiopia and eastern and northern Kenya.

Taxonomy
Acraea miranda, sister-species of A. mirabilis, is a member of the Acraea natalica species group; see Acraea.
See also Pierre & Bernaud, 2014

References

Butterflies described in 1920
miranda